Hubert Jozef ("Hub") van Doorne (1 January 1900 – 23 May 1979) was the founder of Van Doorne's Aanhangwagenfabriek (Trailer factory) and of Van Doorne's Automobielfabriek (vehicle factory) known as DAF, together with his brother Willem (Wim) van Doorne.

Early years
Van Doorne was born in the small Dutch town by the name America, in Dutch Limburg, the son of blacksmith Martin van Doorne (1870–1912) by his marriage to Petronella Vervoort (1866–1952). In March 1912 the family moved to Deurne where van Doorne's father almost immediately died.

Van Doorne was keen to take on his father's business, but was considered too young: instead he became an apprentice in the small Mandiger machine factory of nearby Eindhoven.

Early career
After the First World War van Doorn was employed as a chauffeur-mechanic by a well known local doctor named Hendrik Wiegersma. Subsequently, he worked for the De Valk brewery. In 1920 he established his own business concentrating on metal working involving items such as stoves, bicycles and motor vehicles.  However, he gave up on this business after four years and returned to Mandiger's as company manager.

Van Doorne's Aanhangwagenfabriek N.V. and its successor

With financial support from the brewery by whom he had been employed ten years earlier, van Doorne returned to self-employment in April 1928, establishing his own metal based manufacturing and repair business, concentrating on items such as cabinets, ladders, window frames and, increasingly, trailers which led to the business being renamed in 1932 as van Doorne's Aanhangwagenfabriek (DAF).  Although the business initially employed just four people, including Hub and his brother Wim, in just one year it expanded to the point where it employed 30 people.  The business subsequently expanded into truck production and, during the Second World War, production of military vehicles.   It was on account of the move into powered vehicles that the firm's name was changed again to Van Doorne's Automobielfabriek (DAF).

The business evolved as a partnership between Hub and his brother Wim, with Hub retaining responsibility for technical and engineering aspects of the business and his brother Wim looking after the financial and administrative aspects.  It was Hub who would develop and apply the concept of continuously variable transmission for which the firm would become well known in the 1950s and 1960s. Their Van Doorne transmission, using a belt drive between two adjustable coned pulleys, was widely used as the Variomatic in small DAF cars.

Personal
Van Doorne married on 15 July 1929,  Henrica Maria Reijnders (1905–1987), the daughter of a substantial local retailer.  She would later receive papal commendation for her energetic work in the social field. The couple produced five recorded children.

For a time the van Doorne family lived in Eindhoven, but they soon returned to Deurne, and were still living there in 1979 when Hub died.  He was buried at the local Jacobshof cemetery where today his body lies in a protected area beside those of his wife and three of his children Anny (1930–2004), Jeffrey (1932–2006) and Piet (1934–1982).

Sources and further reading

This entry includes information from the equivalent entry in the Dutch Wikipedia.

External links (in English)
 Hub Van Doorne's induction into European Automotive Hall of Fame, February 2, 2009

External links (in Dutch)
 Hub en Rie van Doorne in klei - Eindhovens Dagblad, 9 December 2006
 Duobeeld officieel als geschenk aanvaard - Eindhovens Dagblad, 5 mei 2007
 Balkenende onthult beeld Van Doorne - Eindhovens Dagblad, 7 augustus 2007
 'Komst premier toont belang V. Doorne' - Eindhovens Dagblad, 7 augustus 2007
 Beeld van Doornes geplaatst in Deurne - Eindhovens Dagblad, 17 augustus 2007
 Balkenende onthult beeld Van Doornes - Eindhovens Dagblad, 18 augustus 2007

1900 births
1979 deaths
20th-century Dutch businesspeople
Dutch automobile designers
20th-century Dutch inventors
European founders of automobile manufacturers
People from Horst aan de Maas